Deng Zuyu (1891–1996) was a Republic of China politician. He was born in Jiangxi. He served in the government of Wang Jingwei.

Disappearance
After the downfall of Wang's government in August 1945. Deng was arrested and on October 8, 1946, was convicted of treason and sentenced to 15 years in prison. He appealed, and on February 28, 1948, his conviction and sentence was upheld. His ultimate fate is unknown.

Bibliography

See also
List of people who disappeared

1891 births
Chinese collaborators with Imperial Japan
Missing person cases in China
Politicians from Ji'an
Republic of China politicians from Jiangxi
Year of death unknown